Tor Ulven (14 November 1953 – 18 May 1995) was a Norwegian poet. He is considered one of the major poets of the Norwegian post-war era, and won several major literary prizes in Norwegian literature.

Biography
Tor Arvid Ulven was born in Oslo, Norway. He published several poetry collections before he began writing prose. Ulven published Skyggen av urfuglen the first of five collections of poetry in 1977. His early works, consisting of traditional modernist verse poetry, were heavily influenced by the writings of  French writer and  poet André Breton (1896–1966) and the surrealism movement. As the 1980s progressed he developed a more independent voice, both stylistically and thematically. The later part of his work consists mainly of prose. He wrote a number of essays dealing with literature, philosophy, music and visual arts.

For a number of years he had lived in relative physical isolation due to illness. He committed suicide in 1995 in Oslo.

Influence 
In Joachim Trier's 2006 film Reprise Tor Ulven is mentioned by Philip as a writer that influenced him and is the inspiration for the character Sten Egil Dahl. In Karl Ove Knausgård's My Struggle II, Knausgård is filled with excitement when his prose is compared to Ulven's.

Awards
Dobloug prize - 1995
Obstfelder prize -1993 
Hartvig Kirans prize - 1990

Bibliography 
 1977: Skyggen av urfuglen (poems)
 1980: Etter oss, tegn (poems)
 1981: Forsvinningspunkt (poems)
 1987: Det tålmodige (poems and prose poems)
 1988: Gravgaver (prose)
 1989: Søppelsolen (poems)
 1990: Nei, ikke det (short stories)
 1991: Fortæring (prose poems)
 1993: Avløsning (novel) - Replacement (English translation, 2012)
 1994: Vente og ikke se (short stories)
 1995: Stein og speil (prose poems)
 1997: Essays

References

1953 births
1995 suicides
Writers from Oslo
20th-century male writers
20th-century Norwegian poets
Norwegian male poets
Dobloug Prize winners